The Superior Union Depot or Superior station of Superior, Wisconsin was built in 1905, replacing a previous depot, which had burned down in 1904. It was built of Lake Superior brown sandstone and designed by Duluth architects German and Lignell. The depot primarily served the Great Northern Railway, Northern Pacific Railway and Duluth, South Shore and Atlantic Railway. 

Burlington Northern (the company absorbing the Great Northern and the Northern Pacific) ran the final passenger trains (Badger and Gopher, both to Minneapolis and St. Paul) through the station. The Northern Pacific Railway ran local unnamed service to St. Paul and Minneapolis and service to Staples, Minnesota, into the latter 1960s.

Passenger service ceased upon the formation of Amtrak in 1971, but resumed between Minneapolis and Superior in 1975. Wisconsin Governor Patrick Lucey spoke at the station dedication. Superior was served by the Arrowhead and later the North Star between Chicago and Duluth. Service ceased in 1984. The depot continues to exist as a business.

References

External links

Superior, Wisconsin – TrainWeb

Former Amtrak stations in Wisconsin
Superior, Wisconsin
Superior, Wisconsin
1905 establishments in Wisconsin
Railway stations in the United States opened in 1905
Railway stations closed in 1971
Railway stations in the United States opened in 1975
Railway stations closed in 1984
Former railway stations in Wisconsin